Gables is a suburb of Sydney in the state of New South Wales, Australia. Gables is 42 kilometres north-west of the Sydney central business district in the local government area of The Hills Shire. Gables is located in the Hills District on the North West of Sydney.

History
The suburb of Gables was originally the site of a dairy farm owned by Robert Hurrell. This dairy was divided into two parts due to its size and was named Blue Gables and Red Gables. Red Gables Road, which cuts through the middle of the suburb, and The Gables, an ongoing residential development since 2015, were named after the dairy farms. The name of the suburb was subsequently derived from this as well.

Gables was gazetted on 17 July 2020. A large portion of Gables was previously part of the suburb of Box Hill and a smaller portion in the north was part of the suburb of Maraylya.

Education
Santa Sophia Catholic College's permanent campus in Gables began construction in June 2020 and opened for learning on 8 November 2021, ready for Term 1 2022. The school caters Kindergarten to Year 12 students. The school is located at 1 Lakefront Crescent, at the corner of Fontana Parade and Red Gables Road.

Residential areas
The Gables is a residential development within the suburb that is currently being developed by Stockland. When The Gables was first planned in 2015, it was planned to comprise over 4,000 dwellings, a primary school, two sports fields, a  town centre and a  lake central to the development.

At the time of the sale, Celestino had already developed 994 dwellings. Stockland planned to continue developing 1,900 dwellings over the remaining life of the project.

Transport
The suburb is serviced by two bus services operated by Busways, and one service operated by Hillsbus:
 643: Gables to Rouse Hill station
 740: Box Hill (Gables) to Rouse Hill station
 741: Box Hill (Gables) to Riverstone station, with selected services commencing from  via Maraylya on school days

Places of worship

References

External links
Suburb Changes – 'Gables' The Hills' newest Suburb – Hills Shire
Map of Gables – Hills Shire

Suburbs of Sydney
The Hills Shire
2020 establishments in Australia